Kunigunde of Hohenstaufen or  Kunigunde of Swabia (February/March 1202 – 13 September 1248) was the third daughter of Philip, Duke of Swabia and his wife, Irene Angelina.

Family

She and her three sisters were orphaned in 1208; that year, her father was murdered, and a few months later her mother died following the birth of a fifth daughter, who did not live either.

Marriage and children
Kunigunde soon moved to Prague, where her fiancé Wenceslaus lived. He was the eldest surviving son of Ottokar I of Bohemia and his second wife Constance of Hungary. In 1224, Kunigunde married Wenceslaus. They were crowned in 1228.

In 1230, Wenceslaus succeeded his father as King of Bohemia, with Kunigunde as his queen consort. However, Queen Kunigunde seems to be not important in politics, although she founded many monasteries. They had:

Vladislaus III of Moravia (c. 1228 – 3 January 1247).
Ottokar II of Bohemia (c. 1230 – 26 August 1278).
Beatrice of Bohemia (c. 1231 – 27 May 1290), married Otto III, Margrave of Brandenburg.
Agnes of Bohemia (died 10 August 1268), married Henry III, Margrave of Meissen.
An unnamed daughter, who died young.

When Wenceslaus' childless brother Přemysl, Margrave of Moravia died in 1239, the sons of Wenceslaus and Kunigunde were the only chances for the survival of the House of Přemysl. The first-born son Vladislaus died in 1247. His mother probably mourned for him less than his father, who was heartbroken.

In 1248, the younger son Přemysl was enticed by discontented nobles to lead a rebellion against his father. Queen Kunigunde stayed in Prague, but died during this revolt on 13 September 1248. Neither husband nor son attended her funeral. She was buried in the St Agnes Convent.

The rebellion was defeated and Ottokar was imprisoned by his father, but released shortly afterwards.

References

Sources

|-

Bohemian queens consort
Hohenstaufen
German people of Greek descent
1202 births
1248 deaths
13th-century German nobility
13th-century German women
13th-century Bohemian people
13th-century Bohemian women
Daughters of kings